German submarine U-91 was a Type VIIC U-boat of Nazi Germany's Kriegsmarine during World War II.

She was laid down at the Flender Werke in Lübeck as yard number 295, launched on 30 November 1941 and commissioned on 28 January 1942 with Oberleutnant zur See Heinz Walkerling as commanding officer. Command was transferred to Oblt.z.S. Heinz Hungershausen on 20 April 1943.

She was a fairly successful boat, sinking over 26,000 tons of Allied shipping in a career lasting just 14 months and six patrols. She was a member of fifteen wolfpacks. After training with the 5th U-boat Flotilla, U-91 was assigned to the 9th flotilla on 1 September 1942 for operations.

Design
German Type VIIC submarines were preceded by the shorter Type VIIB submarines. U-91 had a displacement of  when at the surface and  while submerged. She had two shafts and two  propellers.

U-91 was fitted with five  torpedo tubes (four fitted at the bow and one at the stern), fourteen torpedoes, one  SK C/35 naval gun, 220 rounds, and a  C/30 anti-aircraft gun. The boat had a complement of between forty-four and sixty.

Service history

First patrol
U-91 departed Kiel for her first patrol on 15 August 1942. Having negotiated the Iceland/Faroes 'gap', she was attacked by a US PBY Catalina on 1 September. (This incident was originally thought to have been against ).

The escort vessels of convoy ON 127 fired on the boat on 12 September; minor damage was sustained.

U-91 sank the Canadian destroyer  on 14 September. The boat fired two torpedoes at 02:05 and confirmed a hit. At 02:15, the submarine came across the damaged Ottawa once again, but mistook her for a different vessel and fired a third torpedo, which destroyed the ship, killing 114 of the 181 men aboard.

She also sank New York southeast of Cape Farewell (Greenland) on 26 September.

She docked in Brest, on the French Atlantic coast, on 6 October.

Second patrol
The boat's second foray started from Brest on 1 November 1942 and finishing there on 26 December. It was relatively uneventful.

Third patrol
U-91 was subject to a "rain of aircraft bombs and depth charges from surface ships" which obliged her to break off an attack to carry out repairs on 21 February 1943.

The boat was soon back in action; on 17 March, U-91 attacked Convoy HX 229. Two American vessels - SS Harry Luckenbach and Irénée Du Pont - were destroyed along with the British merchant ship Nariva. The Luckenbach was hit by two torpedoes after five were fired between 03:37 and 03:41. Luckenbach sank in a mere three minutes, with seventy-one of the eighty men evacuating in lifeboats, although there were no reports of them being rescued. Nariva and Irénée Du Pont had been damaged by  earlier that day. U-91 fired three torpedoes at 05:56: Two finishing off Du Pont, a third crippled Nariva.

The inbound submarine was attacked by a Leigh Light equipped Vickers Wellington of No. 172 Squadron RAF on the western edge of the Bay of Biscay on 27 March. Although not damaged, the boat dived with three men still top-side. Two were recovered, but the third could not be found.

U-91 returned to France, but to Lorient, on 29 March.

Fourth patrol
Sortie number four began from Lorient on 29 April 1943; it was also relatively quiet but terminated in Brest on 7 June.

Fifth patrol
U-91 was attacked by a B-24 Liberator of No. 10 Squadron RCAF on 26 October 1943. The Liberator's assault was thought to have sunk . A few days later, (on the 31st), having found U-584, she commenced the re-fuelling operation, but the two boats were spotted by aircraft from the escort carrier . In the ensuing mayhem, U-91 escaped without damage after diving; U-584 was not so lucky, she was sunk.

Sixth patrol and loss

36 men died with the U-boat including Kapitänleutnant Heinz Hungershausen; there were 16 survivors.

Patrols

Wolfpacks
U-91 took part in 15 wolfpacks, namely:
 Vorwärts (25 August - 26 September 1942)
 Natter (6 – 8 November 1942)
 Westwall (8 November - 12 December 1942)
 Knappen (19 – 25 February 1943)
 Burggraf (4 – 5 March 1943)
 Raubgraf (7 – 17 March 1943)
 Without name (5 – 10 May 1943)
 Lech (10 – 15 May 1943)
 Donau 2 (15 – 26 May 1943)
 Rossbach (6 – 9 October 1943)
 Schlieffen (14 – 22 October 1943)
 Siegfried (22 – 27 October 1943)
 Igel 2 (3 – 17 February 1944)
 Hai 1 (17 – 22 February 1944)
 Preussen (22 – 26 February 1944)

Summary of raiding history

References

Notes

Citations

Bibliography

External links
 

1941 ships
German Type VIIC submarines
Ships built in Lübeck
U-boats commissioned in 1942
U-boats sunk by depth charges
U-boats sunk by British warships
U-boats sunk in 1944
World War II shipwrecks in the Atlantic Ocean
World War II submarines of Germany
Maritime incidents in February 1944